Rashed Al-Mugren (born 1 November 1977) is a Saudi Arabian football player who last played as a goalkeeper for Al Hazm.

Al-Mugren appeared for the Saudi Arabia national football team in a qualifying match for the 2006 FIFA World Cup.

References

External links

1977 births
Living people
Saudi Arabian footballers
Association football goalkeepers
Olympic footballers of Saudi Arabia
Al-Shabab FC (Riyadh) players
Al-Hazem F.C. players
Saudi Professional League players
Saudi Arabia international footballers